VDrift is a cross-platform, free/open source driving simulation made with drift racing in mind. It is released under the GNU General Public License (GPL) v3. It is currently available for Linux, FreeBSD, Mac OS X and Microsoft Windows.

Goals
The goals of the VDrift project are:
 to be a high-quality, open source racing simulation featuring enjoyable and challenging gameplay;
 to take advantage of modern computing hardware to accurately simulate vehicle physics in rich and immersive racing environments; and
 to provide a platform for creative experimentation to a community of developers and artists.

History
VDrift was created by Joe Venzon in early 2005. A fan of Gran Turismo, Joe had a lot of fun trying to drift in GT4, though he was disappointed with GT4's physics after loss of traction. Looking around online, the open source Vamos Automotive Simulator performed much better, although the graphics and features were minimal. Building around Vamos, using code adapted from his earlier 3D engine experiments, Joe created the first version of VDrift.

So far, every release has been a testing/development quality release. For this and other reasons, dates are used instead of version numbers.

The driving physics engine was recently re-written from scratch but was inspired by and owes much to the Vamos physics engine.

Originally developed on a SourceForge repository, the project seems to have shifted around 2011 to a GitHub one.

Features
This game is in the early stages of development but is already very playable. Currently the game features:
 45 tracks based on famous real-world tracks
 39 cars based on real-world vehicles
 Very realistic, simulation-grade driving physics
 Mouse/joystick/gamepad/wheel/keyboard support
 Fully modeled tracks, scenery and terrain
 Several different camera modes
 Basic replay system with Skip Forward/Skip Backward
 Fully customizable controls
 Joystick, mouse and keyboard input filtering
 Brake and reverse lights
 Driver aids: automatic shifting, traction control, anti-lock braking
 Experimental force feedback
 Race against up to 3 AI with variable difficulty
 Engine and road sounds

Reception and impact 
The game was reviewed between 2006 and 2009 by multiple websites.

The game became a quite popular downloadable freeware title and was downloaded between 2005 and May 2017 alone via SourceForge over 2.3 million times, Softpedia counted 58,000 downloads, and Softonic another 175,000 downloads in May 2017.

Derivatives 
Due to the Free and open source license of Vdrift forks and derivatives are possible and encouraged. Stunt Rally is an example which is based on VDrift and uses OGRE.

See also

List of open source games
 TORCS, another open source 3D car racing simulator.

References

External links

 Official site
 Vamos Physics Engine

Racing simulators
Linux games
MacOS games
Windows games
Racing video games
Open-source video games